The 11th Street Bridge was completed in December 1915 to carry vehicles across the Arkansas River at Tulsa, Oklahoma. Used from 1916 to 1972, it was also a part of U.S. Route 66. Functionally, it has been replaced by the I-244 bridges across the Arkansas. At present, the bridge is in poor structural condition and unsafe even for pedestrians. In 2008, the gates were locked to exclude all visitors.

This bridge was added on December 13, 1996, to the National Register of Historic Places under Criteria A and C. Its NRIS number is 96001488. It was named the "Cyrus Avery Route 66 Memorial Bridge" in 2004.

Although the bridge still stands, it is considered unsafe for use and has been closed to vehicles since 1980 and to pedestrians since 2008.

Construction
Engineered by Harrington, Howard and Ash of Kansas City, this bridge replaced an earlier wooden structure. It was built by the Missouri Valley Bridge and Iron Company for $180,000. It had a railroad track in the center and one vehicular lane on each side of the track.

At the time, it was notable for several reasons:
 It was the first bridge built for the purpose of carrying automobiles across the Arkansas River
 It was one of the longest concrete structures in the Midwestern United States
 It was the first multi-span concrete bridge constructed in Oklahoma.

In 1929, the original balustrades and Victorian-style lights were replaced with Art Deco guardrails and lights. A 1934 project constructed a second arched bridge immediately downstream and connected both bridges with a single deck.

Obsolescence
Completion of the I-244 bridges in 1967 removed most vehicular traffic from the 11th street bridge. In 1980, it was closed to traffic, although it remained open to pedestrians. In 1996, it was added to the National Register of Historic Places. In 2004, the City of Tulsa, Oklahoma, formally renamed the Eleventh Street Bridge (which carried US 66 over the Arkansas River), the Cyrus Avery Route 66 Memorial Bridge in honor of the man who vigorously promoted the creation of Route 66.

Present condition
Time has not been good to the old bridge, and it has been rated as "quite dangerous" and unsafe for pedestrians by the City of Tulsa. There are holes in the deck, the pavement has buckled in many places, and weeds grow in the cracks. The gates were locked in 2008. Although it was considered as the centerpiece of a Route 66 exhibit, engineers estimated that it would cost $15 million just to be made safe for pedestrians. The conclusion was that the historic structure is "... too expensive to repair, too historic to demolish, and too valuable to ignore".

Ironically, the I-244 bridges have already reached the end of their service lives. The westbound bridge was closed and demolition begun in May 2011. Demolition was 85 percent complete as of August 1, 2011. The demolished structure will be replaced by a double-deck, multimodal span. The top deck will carry vehicles and the lower deck will have a pedestrian way and two railroad tracks (to be added in the future). Completion is scheduled for 2013. Extreme care has been used during the demolition to avoid vibrations that might further damage the old 11th Street Bridge.

Cyrus Avery Centennial Plaza
The ability to utilize the existing bridge, rather than having to build another one over the Arkansas, was said to be the major reason U.S. Route 66 was built through Tulsa.  In commemoration of the Route and the man who helped bring it about, the Cyrus Avery Centennial Plaza is located adjacent to the east entrance of the historic Bridge in Tulsa, at the intersection of Southwest Boulevard and Riverside Drive. The first phase of the plaza included a display of flags of the eight states which were served by U.S Route 66. It was completed in July 2008 and dedicated on August 7, 2008. A skyway with an observation deck leads pedestrians from the visitors' parking lot across Southwest Boulevard.

The plaza features a bronze sculpture, created by artist Robert Summers titled "East Meets West". The sculpture depicts the Avery family riding west in a Model T Ford auto meeting an eastbound horse-drawn carriage.

In 2020, Avery Plaza Southwest is scheduled to open, at the west end of the Bridge. Plans include replicas of three neon signs from Tulsa-area motels from the era, being the Will Rogers Motor Court. Tulsa Auto Court, and the Oil Capital Motel.

Proposed museum
A museum to educate visitors about the significance of Route 66 has been proposed. It would be built on a hill adjacent to the existing parking lot. No date has been established for this project.

Notes

References

External links
 Old U. S. 66 bridge across the Arkansas River

Road bridges on the National Register of Historic Places in Oklahoma
Buildings and structures in Tulsa, Oklahoma
Art Deco architecture in Oklahoma
Bridges completed in 1917
Former road bridges in the United States
Bridges on U.S. Route 66
National Register of Historic Places in Tulsa, Oklahoma
U.S. Route 66 in Oklahoma
Bridges over the Arkansas River
Concrete bridges in the United States
Arch bridges in the United States
1917 establishments in Oklahoma